The GT America Series is a sports car racing series based in the United States which runs as a support series to the GT World Challenge America. It is managed by the Stéphane Ratel Organisation and sanctioned by the United States Auto Club.

History
The series was announced in October 2020, replacing the GT Sports Club America and the Sprint category of the GT4 America Series. The first race was run on March 6, 2021 and was won by George Kurtz. At the end of the opening season, Charlie Luck was crowned the inaugural overall champion, while Jason Bell won the GT4 class championship.

Class structure
The series places strong emphasis on Bronze-rated and gentleman drivers in the single-driver sprint race format. Races are 40 minutes in length, with no required pit stops. Entries are split into three classes; SRO3 (featuring GT3-homologated cars), GT2, and GT4. Previous generation GT3 machinery is also homologated for the competition.

The 2021 season featured a GT3 Masters class, exclusively for drivers above the age of 50, which took a similar format to the former GT Sports Club's Titanium class. With many Bronze-rated drivers already over the age of 50, and inaugural champion Charlie Luck claiming both the Masters and Overall championships, the class was disbanded ahead of the 2022 season.

Champions

See also
GT World Challenge America
GT4 America Series
TC America Series

References

External links
Official Website

Sports car racing series
Auto racing series in the United States
Group GT3
GT4 (sports car class)